This article lists the election results of the Social Democratic Party (SDP) in UK elections, founded following the dissolution of the "Continuing" Social Democratic Party after the even further dissolution of the original Social Democratic Party .

Local government elections

1995

General elections

1992

Notes: Received 6,649 votes out of 33,614,074 (0.1%) | Position- 21/35 

Source:

1997

Notes: Received 1,246 votes out of 31,286,284 (0.0%) | Position- 42/49 

Source:

2010

Notes: Received 1,551 votes out of 29,687,604 (0.0%) | Position- 43/58

Sources:

2015

Notes: Received 125 votes out of 30,697,525 (0.0%) | Position- N/A because the party received less than 400 votes

Source:

2017

Notes: Received 469 votes out of 32,204,184 (0.0%) | Position- 37/41

Source:

2019

Notes: Received 3,295 votes out of 32,014,110 (0.0%) | Position- 25/47

Source:

By-elections

1987–1992 Parliament

2017–2019 Parliament

2019–present Parliament

Scottish Parliament elections

2021

Notes: Received 405 votes out of 2,706,761 | Position- 21/25

Sources:

London mayoral elections
2021

Source:

London Assembly elections

2021

Source:

South Yorkshire mayoral elections

References

Election results by party in the United Kingdom